Black Dog & Leventhal (and its imprint Tess Press) is a book publisher located in New York City. The company was founded by J.P. Leventhal in 1992 or 1993. It publishes general non-fiction but is best known for comprehensive illustrated information-based works. Black Dog & Leventhal's books were distributed by Workman Publishing Company until the company's acquisition by Hachette Book Group in 2014. After Leventhal's retirement in 2017, Black Dog & Leventhal became an imprint of Running Press.

Notable authors 
Black Dog & Leventhal has published many acclaimed authors, including David Baldacci, Sandra Brown, Michael Connelly, Malcolm Gladwell, Sally Mann, Gwyneth Paltrow, James Patterson, and Stephen M. Silverman.

References

External links

Publishing companies of the United States